Bluewater, New Mexico may refer to:
Bluewater, Lincoln County, New Mexico, unincorporated community
Bluewater, McKinley County, New Mexico, census-designated place
Bluewater Village, New Mexico, census-designated place in Cibola County with the Bluewater post office

See also
Bluewater Lake State Park in Cibola County
Las Tusas, New Mexico, census-designated place in Cibola County, formerly known as Bluewater Acres